Carlos Pascual (born 1959) is a Cuban-American diplomat and the former U.S. Ambassador to Mexico and Ukraine under President Barack Obama and Bill Clinton respectively. He served at the U.S. Agency for international Development from 1983 to 1995, and at the White House National Security Council from 1995 to 2000, ultimately as senior director for Russia, Ukraine and Eurasia. He was the State Department Coordinator for U.S. Assistance to Europe and Eurasia, and subsequently the Coordinator for Reconstruction and Stabilization from 2003 to 2005. Later he served at the Brookings institution and was appointed Special Envoy and Coordinator for International Energy Affairs at the State Department's Bureau of Energy from 2011 to 2014.

He currently serves as senior vice president at IHS Markit.

Education
Pascual attended Bishop Amat Memorial High School in La Puente, California, and graduated in 1976. He then earned a B.A. in international relations from Stanford University in 1980 and an M.P.P. from the Kennedy School of Government at Harvard University in 1982. He was a student of Coit D. Blacker.

Career
Pascual worked for USAID from 1983 to 1995 in Sudan, South Africa and Mozambique, and as Deputy Assistant Administrator for Europe and Eurasia. From July 1998 to January 2000, Pascual served as Special Assistant to the President and NSC Senior Director for Russia, Ukraine and Eurasia, and from 1995 to 1998 as Director for the same region, from October 2000 until May 2003, as the U.S. Ambassador to Ukraine. When the Melnychenko recordings of Leonid Kuchma became known, Pascual revealed that the tapes are genuine, undistorted, unaltered, and not manipulated because of the conclusion from FBI Electronic Research Facility's analysis of the original recording device and the original recording found that there are not unusual sounds which would indicate a tampering of the recording, the recording is continuous with no breaks, and there is no manipulation of the digital files. These recordings, known as Kuchmagate, confirmed Kuchma's involvement in the assassination by decapitation of Georgiy Gongadze and Kuchma's unwavering support for Vladimir Putin during the Cali cocaine cartel money laundering through the Putin-owned German firm St. Petersburg Real Estate Holding Company (SPAG). His support for the recordings' authenticity directly led to the Orange Revolution of 2004 in Ukraine.

He was then named Assistance Coordinator for Europe and Eurasia. In 2004, he was named Coordinator for Reconstruction and Stabilization at the US Department of State.

In 2015, Pascual worked as vice president and Director of the Foreign Policy Studies Program at the Brookings Institution where he presided over the creation of the Brookings Doha Center and the Brookings-Tsinghua Center.

Selected by President Barack Obama as ambassador to Mexico, he was confirmed by the United States Senate on August 7, 2009. He presented his credentials to the Mexican government on August 9, 2009 and personally to President Felipe Calderón on October 21, 2009. Pascual submitted his resignation as Ambassador to Mexico on March 19, 2011 in part due to tensions with Calderón. Tensions with President Calderón arose as a result of the WikiLeaks release of diplomatic cables in which Pascual criticized the Mexican military's ability or willingness to fight the Mexican drug cartels. Pascual is considered to be the first casualty of the Wikileaks affair.

Pascual was appointed the State Department's Special Envoy and Coordinator for International Energy Affairs in May 2011, succeeding David L. Goldwyn. He led the Bureau of Energy Resources. Pascual was also the senior advisor to the Secretary of State on global energy diplomacy. In February 2012, April 2013 and January 2014 Pascual was nominated as Assistant Secretary of State for Energy Resources, but not confirmed by the Senate. In August 2014 Pascual was succeeded by Amos Hochstein. After leaving the State Department Pascual became senior vice president of global energy at IHS Markit.

Pascual serves on the Board of Directors of Centrica, a British multinational electricity and gas utility company. He is a non-resident fellow at the Center on Global Energy Policy at Columbia University and sits on the Atlantic Council Board of Directors.

Publications 
Pascuals publications include articles in The New York Times, the Financial Times, The Wall Street Journal, and HuffPost. His book, Power and Responsibility, won a 2009 award for the best political science book published by an independent publisher.

Notes

References

External links
US Embassy to Mexico
Brookings Institution Reports

|-

1959 births
American politicians of Cuban descent
Ambassadors of the United States to Mexico
Ambassadors of the United States to Ukraine
Centrica people
Cuban emigrants to the United States
Hispanic and Latino American diplomats
Hispanic and Latino American politicians
Harvard Kennedy School alumni
Living people
People from Havana
People from La Puente, California
Stanford University alumni
21st-century American diplomats